Nine's Wide World of Sports is a long running sports anthology brand on Australian television that airs on the Nine Network and streaming service Stan. All major sports, events and series covered by the network are broadcast under this brand, the flagship sports being rugby league (National Rugby League), rugby union (Super Rugby and Wallabies international matches) and Grand Slam tennis (Australian Open, French Open, Wimbledon and the US Open). Previous sporting rights include the Australian rules football (Australian Football League), Australian Cricket Team home season, spring and autumn horse racing, swimming until 2008, and golf (U.S. Masters) since 2018.

History

1981–1990s – Creation and contract competition
Wide World of Sports (WWoS) is a long-used title for Nine's sport programming. All sports broadcasts on Nine air under the WWoS brand. It was also the name of a popular sports magazine program that aired most Saturdays and Sundays. This program filled many of the summer daytime hours. It was first pitched by Gordon Carr who went on to hold a broad portfolio in WWoS. The program premiered at 1:00 pm on Saturday, 23 May 1981, and was initially hosted by Mike Gibson and Ian Chappell, before being hosted in the 1990s by Max Walker and Ken Sutcliffe. Ian Maurice was the regular anchor at the WWOS Update Desk. The show ended in 1999, due in large part to the rise of Fox Sports (which Nine's owner owned half of) and other subscription sport channels, but the show returned in 2008 on Sunday mornings.

It was unrelated to the series "Wide World of Sports" aired by ABC in the United States, which started in 1961. From the early 1970s, the main sport aired nationally under the WWoS brand was cricket. Nine's majority owner Kerry Packer created World Series Cricket in part because he couldn't obtain the rights to Australian test matches at home, even though he offered the Australian Cricket Board a $1.5 million 3-year contract which was rejected by the ACB who signed a 3-year deal with the ABC to broadcast test matches. This led to Packer signing in secret some of the world's best cricket players for a breakaway competition.

In 1978, 35 of the "world's best players" had signed with Packer's World Series Cricket, which was broadcast in competition with ABC's cricket coverage of the ICC. Nine's Wide World of Sports was the "first broadcaster to put a microphone on the players for an international cricket match," which later became common practice in the industry. ABC and Nine then signed a truce after a long dispute in 1979, with Nine securing the exclusive rights to telecast Australian cricket. From that point until 2006, Nine based its summer schedule around broadcasts of cricket internationally and domestic. Its cricket broadcasts in that era revolutionized the way the sport was covered, featuring cameras placed at both ends of the field (after Packer famously complained about seeing "cricketer's bums" every second over), instant replays, and other innovations. World Series Cricket made many other changes to cricket, having a huge impact on the game.

David Hill was among the early executives that developed WWoS. In the early 1980s, well-known hosts and presenters on Wide World of Sports included Mike Gibson and Ian Chappell, both the inaugural hosts of the Saturday afternoon program in 1981.

Billy Birmingham in 1984 released a comedy album that satirized cricket "and in particular Channel Nine's iconic commentary team with Richie Benaud the central figure," which became popular in Australia, called The Wired World of Sports. Among the hosts satirized were his friend Mike Gibson. Birmingham went on to release a series of albums ridiculing all aspects of Wide World of Sports, calling the show "Wired World of Sports". From the first to the most recent (2006), all have reached number one on the Australian album chart.

David Hill helped establish Nine's Wide World of Sports early on, and was a "sounding board when the billionaire famously sold the network to Alan Bond and then bought it back three years later for less than a quarter of the price." Writes the Sydney Morning Herald, "Packer's decision to sell Nine to Bond in 1987 for $1.2 billion - before buying back the network in 1990 for $250 million - is legendary in Australian television." Other early broadcasters at WWoS included Ron Casey.

January 1995 saw the beginning of Premier Sports Network, the channel that was to become Fox Sports. It secured the rights to Australia's cricket tour of the West Indies, Nine's first challenge since winning its World Series war. Nine tried to stop the broadcast under Australia's "anti-siphoning" rules, which exist to stop certain popular sporting events being screened exclusively on pay television. But it failed when Premier Sports Network came to an agreement to broadcast the tour free to air on Network 10. 

WWoS's other main sport was and is rugby league. This was challenged in 1997 by the establishment of Super League, the repercussions of which led to Nine's parent company owning half of Fox Sports that year, and ultimately Nine's move away from popular live sport. This partial purchase of Fox Sports roughly coincided with the end of Nine's traditional Saturday and Sunday daytime schedule of sports programming. What had once filled it now filled subscription channels, mainly Fox Sports. Old movies and other low rating programs filled much of the space. Between the late 1970s and 1997, when Australians had wanted to watch continuous sport at home on a summer weekend, they had largely done so by tuning to Nine. Those in NSW, Queensland and the ACT did this all year round, due to rugby league's popularity in those areas. Now Fox Sports had that mantle, and gave viewers continuous sport all week long.

In 1990s, the Wide World of Sports marketed sports paraphernalia such as signed and framed bats, and items from the Australian Rugby League.

Paul Sheahan hosted Nine's Wide World of Sports program until 1999. Max Walker hosted until it ended in 1999.

2000–2008 – Changing broadcasting deals
In 2001, The Nine Network acquired broadcast rights for Friday night and Sunday afternoon games in the Australian Football League, the elite Australian rules football competition in 2001. Seven had previously held the TV rights for 44 years prior. They shared the rights with Network Ten and Foxtel from 2002 through to 2006, but the deal assigned exclusive rights for the finals series to Ten, a deal which reportedly flabbergasted Nine boss Kerry Packer.

As it also had the rights for all major swimming competitions until 2008, major swimming competitions were shown in primetime. During the early to mid-2000s, Nine for the first time had the FTA rights to the highest competitions of Australia's four biggest spectator sports: rugby league, Australian rules (shared with Ten), cricket and swimming. While Nine no longer had the volume of sport it once had, during the 2000-2006 period it dominated non-Olympic sport broadcasting in Australia.

With existing agreements then set to expire in 2006 and 2007, in 2005, Channel Nine secured a deal to air NRL games until the end of 2012.

Eddie McGuire was named CEO of Nine Network with oversight of the Wide World of Sports brand in 2006.

In January 2006, the Seven Network and Network Ten exercised their "first and last" rights agreement with the AFL to trump the Nine Network's $780 million bid for broadcasting rights for the years 2007 to 2011. If Seven and Ten were unable to match the AFL's "quality of coverage" demands by 5 May 2006 (better coverage into regional areas, northern states and on pay television, as promised in the Nine bid) the AFL would have been allowed to award the broadcasting rights back to Nine.

The Seven/Ten consortium, however, obtained the rights, with Nine broadcasting its last AFL match on Sunday 3 September 2006. The match was hosted by Tony Jones with a guest appearance from Nine's then chief executive and former AFL commentator Eddie McGuire.

In 2004, it was making an annual income of around $30 million on broadcasting Australian cricket, with the television rights expiring at the end of the 2006. Around 2004, Cricket Australia began negotiating for a higher price. In 2005, Nine Network bid on cricket for $45 million a year, winning the contract and signing a seven year deal with Cricket Australia.

From the beginning of the 2006-2007 cricket season, Nine no longer broadcast Australian domestic cricket.

In 2012, Nine Network had a $1 billion contract for NRL rights and a $300 million cricket rights deal set to expire the following March.

Instead, it replaced the coverage with delayed National Basketball League matches in October, with weekly one-hour highlight shows and full games. The domestic cricket matches, long a mainstay of Nine's summer programming, moved exclusively to Fox Sports.

2008–2020: return of Wide World of Sports
After a ten-year hiatus, it was announced that the Wide World of Sports weekly television program would return to Nine on 16 March 2008, using the same theme song as the old version, as well as accessing old footage for replays. This show was hosted by the previous host Ken Sutcliffe, with footy show star James Brayshaw as well as former Australian cricketer Adam Gilchrist. Revolving co-hosts included former swimmers Giaan Rooney, Nicole Livingstone and former cricketer Michael Slater. That year, it broadcast the Australian Open with its own team of commentators. The show originally aired for 90 minutes but was recently extended to two hours. It aired on Sunday mornings at 9am till 11am.

In 2008, the Nine Network and Microsoft joint venture ninemsn had a section dedicated to the Wide World of Sports. In 2009,  Grant Hackett and Michael Slater joined the team as co-hosts alongside Sutcliffe and Rooney. Livingstone did not return, as she joined Network Ten as a commentator. Rooney resigned from the Nine Network at the end of 2012 to join the Seven Network. It was thought that the Seven Network would continue its tradition of airing the Olympic Games for the 2012 Summer Olympics in London. However, Nine in joint partnership with Foxtel, has secured broadcasting rights which the network has described as the most comprehensive coverage of the Olympics. The partnership also won the rights to the 2010 Winter Olympics in Vancouver.

For more than 40 years, the Nine Network had also broadcast the prestigious Wimbledon tennis tournament before ultimately dropping it after the 2010 tournament, citing declining ratings. The last Wimbledon match televised by Nine was the men's singles final played between Rafael Nadal and Tomáš Berdych, which Nadal won. The Seven Network have since picked up the broadcasting rights to Wimbledon, from 2011 onwards. The Australian Rugby League Commission in August 2012 agreed to a five-year broadcast deal in Australia with Nine Entertainment to air on its Wide World of Sports brand, and for $1.025 billion, was the "most lucrative agreement in rugby league history."

In 2013, the Wide World of Sports brand was facing challenges from other television networks its broadcast rights to Cricket Australia. Nine had a contract clause, however, so that if it were to "match the highest offer means it is still expected to retain the rights, despite its exclusive window for negotiations having closed." With Nine Network's cricket coverage winning in 1982, the television show won "Most Popular Sports Program" at the Logie Awards in 1986. It was nominated for the "Most Popular Sports Coverage" award at the 2009, 2010, 2013, 2014 and 2015 Logie Awards, being beaten by The NRL Footy Show on all occasions.

Until 2016, Steve Crawley was the rugby league boss at Wide World of Sports, when he was hired by FOX Sports. He was replaced by Tom Malone as Director of Sport. After she was fired in 2014 as a cost-cutting measure, in 2016 Emma Freedman again signed up with Channel Nine's Wide World of Sports as an announcer. The weekly show was no longer airing as of 2017. Sports Sunday replaced the show in the Sunday 10am time slot.

In 2017, the WWoS channel was featuring the Netball World Series, hosted by Erin Molan and with commentators Liz Ellis, Sharelle McMahon, Cath Cox and Anne Sargeant. In 2017, the channel signed Ray Warren for five more years, for as long as they retained their rugby league rights. Also that year, WWoS announced a GPS player tracking system into its rugby broadcasting. WWoS relinquished the rights broadcast cricket in 2018 to Seven West Media, instead picking up the Australian Open tennis broadcast for that summer. In 2019, the WWoS was streaming rugby on its digital platform, with a rugby commentary team led by Ray Warren. In 2018, WWoS announced had secured "free TV and streaming rights" for the Masters Tournament to be played at Augusta National Golf Club.

The Wide World of Sports studio was set up in Melbourne for the 2019 Australian Open for tennis, with a commentary team headed up by John McEnroe and Jim Courier. Originally Wide World of Sports had been set to air it for 2020 until 2024, but they were sold the 2019 broadcast rights by Seven Network. Nine's Wide World of Sports in 2019 included the Australian Open, "the Sydney International, Brisbane International and Hopman Cup tennis tournaments, the Holden State of Origin, the Cricket World Cup, the Ashes, The Masters and the NBL."

Macquarie Media in 2020 began airing an hour-long Wide World of Sports radio broadcast hosted by Mark Levy. Also in April 2020, WWoS introduced a new show on the Australian Open, hosted by Todd Woodbridge and Sam Groth, titled the Greatest Australian Open Matches. In 2020, the National Rugby League and Nine resolved a contract dispute over scheduling.

2020–present: rugby and tennis expansion, Stan Sport 
In November 2020, Nine Entertainment Co. acquired rights to Rugby Australia, as well as the French Open and The Championships, Wimbledon, with plans for pay-television coverage (ad-free and on-demand) to migrate to a new sport-oriented package on its subscription streaming service Stan, and selected matches/events to be broadcast free on the Nine Network.

On 8 February 2023, it was announced that Nine had re-gained the rights to the Olympic Games from 2024 through to the 2032 Summer Olympics in Brisbane.

Events
Nine's Wide World of Sports holds broadcast rights to the following events:

Current

Past

1 The Nine Network televised the 2011 US Open final between Serena Williams and Samantha Stosur in its entirety.

Programs
Nine's Wide World of Sports has presented the following recurring programs:

Past

Presenters and commentators
Nine's Wide World of Sports has hosts and commentators for a variety of sporting events. The following is a list of past and present personalities featured:

Sports Sunday
 Roz Kelly (2022–present)
 James Bracey (host, 2018–2022)
 Liz Ellis
 Peter FitzSimons
 Mark Taylor
 other assorted guests

Wide World of Sports

Past
 Michael Slater
 Emma Freedman
 John Steffenson
 Clint Stanaway
 Sally Fitzgibbons
 Ian Chappell 
 Lisa Curry 
 Ian Maurice 
 Mike Gibson 
 Tony Greig 
 Max Walker
 Adam Gilchrist
 Giaan Rooney
 Yvonne Sampson
 Ken Sutcliffe
 Richie Calendar
 Kerryn Pratt
 Bill Lawry

Any Given Sunday
 James Brayshaw (2005)
 Nicole Livingstone (2006)
 Garry Lyon (2005)
 Mick Molloy (2006)
 Sam Newman (2005)

2012 London Olympics
Various Nine programs including Today, Mornings, Millionaire Hot Seat, The Footy Show, 60 Minutes and Australia's Funniest Home Videos went on hiatus during Nine's broadcast of the 2012 London Olympics. A daily two-hour highlights package London Gold aired at 9am weekdays following the live overnight coverage.

 Eddie McGuire
 Ken Sutcliffe
 Giaan Rooney
 James Brayshaw
 Ray Warren
 Garry Lyon
 Karl Stefanovic
 Leila McKinnon
 James Tomkins
 Kerri Pottharst
 Scott McGrory
 Debbie Watson
 Melinda Gainsford-Taylor
 Michael Slater
 Andrew Gaze
 Andrew Voss
 Grant Hackett
 Jane Flemming
 Mark Nicholas
 Cameron Williams
 Phil Liggett
 Simon O'Donnell
 Billy Brownless
 Tony Jones
 Daley Thompson
 Steve Ovett

Rugby league

Current

 James Bracey (Host, 2017–present)
 Danika Mason (Host, 2021–present)
 Mathew Thompson (Chief Commentator, 2012–present)
 Peter Psaltis (Chief Commentator, 2019–present)
 Paul Vautin (commentator, 1992–present)
 Phil Gould (Commentator, 1994–present)
 Wally Lewis (Commentator, 2006–present)
 Andrew Johns (Commentator, 2007–present)
 Brad Fittler (Commentator, 2010–present)
 Allana Ferguson (Commentator, 2018–present)
 Ruan Sims (Commentator, 2018–present)
 Johnathan Thurston (Commentator, 2019–present)
 Darren Lockyer (Sideline Commentator, 2012–present)
 Billy Slater (Commentator, 2019–present)
 Sam Thaiday (Sideline Commentator, 2019–present)
 Paul Gallen (Sideline Commentator, 2020–present)
 Sonny Bill Williams (Commentator, 2021–present)
 Cameron Smith (Commentator, 2021–present)

NSW Cup
 Peter Psaltis (commentator, 2019–present)
 Jamie Soward (commentator, 2018–present)
 Danika Mason (host, 2019–present)

QLD Cup
 Mark Braybrook (commentator, 2019–present)
 Scott Sattler (commentator, 2013–present)
 Peter Badel (sideline commentator, 2016) 
 Adam Jackson (sideline commentator 2016–present)

The NRL Footy Show

Current
 Andrew Johns (co-host, 2018–present)
 Brad Fittler (co-host, 2018–present)
 Ryan Girdler (co-host, 2018–present)
 Darryl Brohman (small talk segment, 2010–present)
 Beau Ryan (regular appearances, 2010–present)
 Joel Caine (Sportsbet updates, 2014–present)

Former
 Peter Sterling (1992–2007, 2010, co-host)
 Steve Roach (1992–1999, co-host)
 Ray Hadley  (1995–1997, co-host)
 Paul Harrogan (2001–2003, co-host)
 Matthew Johns (2003–2009, co-host)
 Laurie Daley (2008, co-host)
 Andrew Voss (2009)
 Benji Marshall (2010–2013, 2015)
 Brad Fittler (2010–2011, co-host) 
 Michael Slater (2012–2014, co-host)
 Gorden Tallis (2013–2015)
 Erin Molan (host, 2018–2021)

The Sunday NRL Footy Show

 Peter Sterling (panelist) 
 Brad Fittler (panelist) 
 Allana Ferguson (panelist)

Former

 Ray Warren, (Chief Commentator, 1988–1989, 1991–2021)
 Darrell Eastlake (1983–1993)
 Jack Gibson (1983–1989)
 Mick Cronin (1988)
 Warren Ryan (1989)
 Michael Cleary (1989)
 Ellery Hanley (1989, 1992)
 Peter Sterling (1991–2021)
 Gavin Miller (1991)
 Gene Miles (1993–1994)
 Matthew Johns (2003–2009)
 Gary Belcher (1992–1997)
 Steve "Blocker" Roach (1992–1998)
 Andrew Voss (1994–2012) (host/commentator)
 Paul Harragon (2000–2008)
 Mark Coyne (2001–2002)
 Mark Geyer (2007–2008)
 Kevin Walters (2007) (Qld Matches Only)
 Steve Walters (2001–2002)
 Ben Ikin (2006–2009) Qld Cup (2012)
 Wendell Sailor (2007, 2009–2010)
 Jason Taylor (2002, 2010)
 Laurie Daley (2008)
 Mark Gasiner (2007) (Guest Commentator)
 Adam MacDougall (2007) (Guest Commentator)
 Tim Gilbert (chief commentator, 2006–2015)
 Gorden Tallis (sideline commentator, 2013–2015)
 Yvonne Sampson (host, 2013–2016)
 Brett Finch (sideline commentator, 2014–2016)
 Erin Molan (2016–2021)
 Ray Hadley (Chief Commentator) (2012–2018)

Tennis

Australian Open
 Tony Jones (Host, 2018-present)
 James Bracey (Host, 2018-present)
 Roz Kelly (Host, 2022-present)
 Rebecca Maddern (Host, 2018-2021)
 Seb Costello (Host, 9Gem, 2018-present)
 Nick McArdle (Host, 9Gem, 2022-present)
 Emma Lawrence  (Host, 9Gem, 2023-present)
 Erin Molan (Host, 9Gem, 2018-2020)
 Alicia Loxley (Host, 9Gem, 2020-2021)
 Sam McClure  (Host, 9Gem, 2021-2022)
 Jim Courier (Commentator, 2018-present)
 Todd Woodbridge (Commentator, 2018-present)
 Dylan Alcott (Commentator, 2018-present)
 Jelena Dokic (Commentator, 2018-present)
 Alicia Molik (Commentator, 2018-present)
 Sam Smith (Commentator, 2018-present)
 Lleyton Hewitt (Commentator, 2018-present)
 Casey Dellacqua (Commentator, 2019-present)
 Darren Cahill (Commentator, 2022-present)
 Peter Psaltis (Commentator, 2023-present)
 John McEnroe (Commentator, 2018-2020)
 Sam Groth (Commentator, 2018-2022)
 Tom Rehn (Commentator, 2019-2022)

French Open
 Todd Woodbridge (Host and Commentator, 2021-present)
 Brett Phillips (Late Night Host, 2021-present)
 Jelena Dokic (Commentator, 2021-present)
 Sam Groth (Commentator, 2021-2022)

Wimbledon
 Todd Woodbridge (Host and Commentator, 2021)
 Brett Phillips (Late Night Host, 2021-present)
 Jelena Dokic (Commentator, 2021-present)
 Sam Groth (Commentator, 2021-present)
 Roz Kelly (Host, 2022-present)
 Tony Jones (Correspondent, 2022-present)

US Open
 Todd Woodbridge (Host and Commentator, 2022-present)
 Brett Phillips (Early Morning Host, 2022-present)
 Jelena Dokic (Commentator, 2022-present)

Cricket
Current

 Roz Kelly (host)
 Mark Taylor (analyst)
 Callum Ferguson (analyst)
 Steve O'Keefe (analyst)

Cricket World Cup 2019, Women's Ashes 2019, Ashes 2019

 Rebecca Maddern (host - Cricket World Cup)
 James Bracey (host - Cricket World Cup)
 Clint Stanaway (host - Cricket World Cup)
 Alicia Muling (host - Women's Ashes)
 Todd Woodbridge (host - The Ashes)
 Mark Taylor (host/analyst - Cricket World Cup, Women's Ashes, The Ashes)
 Lisa Sthalekar (host/analyst - Cricket World Cup, Women's Ashes, The Ashes)
 Ian Healy (analyst - Cricket World Cup, Women's Ashes, The Ashes)
 Mel Jones (analyst - The Ashes)
 Rob Canning (reporter - Cricket World Cup)

2018 (most recent) Home Summer of Cricket

 Mark Nicholas, (host/commentator, 2004–2018)
 Michael Slater (host/commentator, 2005–2018)
 Ian Chappell (commentator, 1980–2018)
 Ian Healy (commentator, 1999–2018)
 Bill Lawry (commentator, 1972–2018)
 Mark Taylor (commentator, 1999–2018)
 Shane Warne (commentator, 2000, 2003, 2008–2011, 2013–2018)
 Michael Clarke (commentator, 2014–2018)
 Tom Moody (commentator, 2010–2018)
 Lisa Sthalekar (commentator - women's matches)
 Mel Jones (commentator - women's matches)

Past

 Richie Benaud (host/commentator, 1972–2013)
 Stephanie Brantz, (boundary commentator, 2006–2007)
 Greg Chappell (commentator, 1989–1997)
 Mike Hussey (commentator, 2013–2016)
 Tony Cozier (commentator, 1972–1992)
 Kate Fitzpatrick (commentator, 1983)
 Adam Gilchrist (commentator, 2008–2011)
 Peter Sterling (commentator, 1993/94)
 Tony Greig (commentator, 1979–2012)
 David Hookes (commentator, 1986–1987)
 Brendon Julian (commentator, 2003)
 Geoff Lawson (commentator, 1989, 1993)
 Rod Marsh (commentator, 1985–1990, 1996–1998)
 Simon O'Donnell, (commentator/Cricket Show host, 1988, 1993–2011)
 Greg Ritchie (commentator, 1995–1997)
 Brett Lee (commentator/Cricket Show co-host, 2011–2016)
 Keith Stackpole (commentator, 1972–1986)
 Jeff Thomson (commentator, 1989)
 Frank Tyson (commentator, 1979–1986)
 Max Walker (commentator, 1985–1991)
 Doug Walters (commentator, 1986–1989)
 Mark Waugh (commentator, 2002)
 Mike Whitney (commentator, 1993–1994)
 Glenn McGrath (commentator, 2012–2013)
 James Brayshaw (host/commentator, 2009–2016)
 Yvonne Sampson (boundary commentator/women's matches host, 2014-2016)

Guest international commentators

 Michael Atherton (2002–2003) Ashes tour to Australia
 Fred Trueman (1982/83) Ashes tour to Australia
 Bob Willis (1986–1987) Ashes tour to Australia
 Geoff Boycott (1990/91) and (1994/95) Ashes tours to Australia
 Ian Botham 1998/99 Ashes tour to Australia
 Colin Croft (1995/96) and (1996–1997)
 Sunil Gavaskar
 David Gower
 Sir Richard Hadlee  (1990/91) and (1993–1994)
 Michael Holding (1992–93 - 2004–2005)
 Waqar Younis (2004/05 & 2016/17)
 David Lloyd (2006–2007, 2013–2014, 2014–2015 and 2015 Ashes in the UK)
 Ian Smith (1997–1998, 2001–2002, 2004–2005, 2007–2008, 2011/12 and 2015/16)
 Michael Vaughan (2010/11, 2013/14, 2015, 2017/18 Ashes tours)
 Kevin Pietersen (2016–2018)
 VVS Laxman (2016)
 Russell Arnold (2017)

Netball
 Clint Stanaway (host, 2017–2021)
 Roz Kelly (host, 2021–2021)
 Jayne Azzopardi (host, 2018–2021)
 Aislin Kriukelis (host, 2018–2021)
 Warren Tredrea (host, 2018–2021)
 Sue Gaudion (host/commentator, 2016–2021)
 Anne Sargeant (commentator, 2016–2021)
 Liz Ellis (commentator, 2016–2021)
 Sharelle McMahon (commentator, 2016–2021)
 Catherine Cox (commentator, 2017–2021)
 Clare McMeniman (commentator, 2018–2021)
 Julie Snook (courtside reporter, 2017–2021)
 Jack Berketa (courtside reporter, 2017–2021)
 Paddy Sweeney (courtside reporter, 2017–2021)
 Alexis Daish (courtside reporter, 2018–2021)
 Carrie-Anne Greenbank (courtside reporter, 2018–2021)
 Michael Atkinson (courtside reporter, 2018–2021)
 Kim Green (commentator, 2019–2021)

 Seb Costello (host/commentator, 2017-2021)
 Erin Molan (host - Fast5 World Series, 2017)
 Laura Geitz (expert analysis, 2016 Fast5 World Series)
 Sharni Layton (expert analysis, 2016 Fast5 World Series)
 Sylvia Jeffreys (host, 2016–2017)
 Tom Mitchell (courtside reporter, 2017)
 Christine Ahern (courtside reporter, 2017)

Association Football
 Clint Stanaway (host, 2015–2017)
 Michael Bridges (expert analysis, 2015–2017)
 David Zdrilic (expert analysis, 2015–2017)
 Harry Kewell (expert analysis, 2017)
 Craig Moore (expert analysis, 2017)
 Brenton Speed (commentator (via Fox Football, 2015–2017)

Tour Down Under Cycling
 Tim Gilbert (host, 2012–2018)
 John Steffensen (co-host, 2016–2018)
 Phil Liggett (commentator, 2012–2018)
 Paul Sherwen (commentator, 2012–2018)
 Robbie McEwen (commentator, 2012–2018)

Rugby union
 Ken Sutcliffe (host)
 Cameron Williams (host)
Bill Baxter (host)
 Brendan Cannon (expert analysis)
 Benn Robinson (expert analysis)
 Phil Waugh (live ground reports & expert analysis)
 Nathan Sharpe (live ground reports & expert analysis)
 Andrew Swain (Secondary Caller), 2021–present
 Sean Maloney (Main Caller), 2021–present
 Nick McArdle (Host), 2021–present
 Roz Kelly (Host), 2021–present
 Tim Horan (Expert Analysis), 2021–present
 Drew Mitchell (Expert Analysis), 2021–present
 Andrew Mehrtens (Expert Analysis), 2021–present
 Allana Ferguson (Expert Analysis), 2021–present
 Morgan Turinui (Expert Analysis), 2021–present
 Justin Harrison (Expert Analysis), 2021–present
 David Campese (Expert Analysis), 2021–present
 Michael Cheika (Expert Analysis), 2021–present
 Sonny Bill Williams (Expert Analysis), 2021–present
 Sera Naiqama (Expert Analysis), 2021–present
 Paddy Sweeney (Sideline), 2021–present
 Michael Atkinson (Sideline), 2021–present

National Basketball League
Bill Baxter (host, 2015–2016)
Brad Rosen (expert analysis, 2015–2016)

Australian Rules Football

AFL

 Eddie McGuire (2002–2005) (Friday Night Football - all games and Sunday Football commentator - Victoria Games - 2002–2004)
 Garry Lyon (2002–2006) (Friday Night Football - all games and Sunday Football expert commentator - Victoria Games)
 Dermott Brereton (2002–2006) Friday Night Football - all games and Sunday Football expert commentator - Interstate Games)
 Dennis Cometti (2002–2006) (Friday Night Football - all games and Sunday Football commentator - Interstate Games)
 James Brayshaw (2002–2006) (Sunday Football commentator - Victoria Games - 2002, 2005–2006 and Interstate Games - 2003–2004, 2006)
 Gerard Healy (2002–2003) (Sunday Football expert commentator) 
 Tony Jones (2002–2006) (Friday Night Football boundary rider, Sunday Football studio host)
 Dr. Peter Larkins (2002–2006) (Friday Night Football boundary rider)
 Anthony Mithen, boundary rider (2002–2003) (Sunday Football boundary rider - Interstate Games)
 Michael Roberts (2002–2006) (Sunday Football boundary rider - Victoria Games - 2002–2003 and  Interstate Games 2004–2006)
 Dwayne Russell (2002–2006) (Friday Night Football - 2006 and Sunday Football commentator - Interstate Games)
 Brian Taylor (2002–2006) (Sunday Football commentator - Victoria Games)

SANFL

 Ken Cunningham (Host)
 Kym Dillon (Commentator)
 Ian Day (Commentator)
 Graham Campbbell (Commentator)
 Brian Cunningham (Field Commentator)

EJ Whitten Legends Game

 Garry Lyon (Host/Commentator)
 James Brayshaw (Commentator)
 Brian Taylor (Commentator)
 Billy Brownless (Commentator)
 Tony Jones (Field Commentator)
 Shane Crawford (Field Commentator)
 Peter Helliar (Commentator)
 Craig Hutchison (Commentator)
 Nathan Brown (Field Commentator)
 Clint Stanaway (Field Commentator)

The Footy Show panellists
 Eddie McGuire (1994–2005, 2017–2018) (host)
 Sam Newman (1994–2018) (regular)
 Trevor Marmalade (1994–2008) (regular)
 Garry Lyon (2006–2015) (host)
 James Brayshaw (2006–2016) (host)
 Rebecca Maddern (2016–2018) (host)
 Craig Hutchison (2007–2011, reporter) (2017, host)
 Neroli Meadows (2019) (host)
 Anthony Lehmann (2019) (host)
 Damian Barrett (2010–2018) (reporter)
 Billy Brownless (2009–2018) (panellist)
 Shane Crawford (2009–2019) (panellist)
 Matthew Lloyd (2012–2013) (panellist)
 Brendon Fevola (2017–2018) (panellist)
 Dane Swan (2017–2018) (panellist)
 Chris Judd (2018) (panellist)
 Dave Hughes (2015–2017) (panellist)

The Sunday Footy Show panellists

Current panelists
 Tony Jones (2006–2008, 2017–present) (host)
 Damian Barrett (2010–present) (reporter)
 Nathan Brown (2010–present)
 Matthew Lloyd (2012–present)
 Kane Cornes (2017–present)

Former panelists
 Max Walker (1993–1998) (original host) 
 Mal Brown (1993–1998)
 Doug Hawkins (1994–1997)
 Sam Kekovich (1993–1998)
 Simon O'Donnell (1993–1996, 2012)
 Lou Richards (1993–2008)
 Ted Whitten (1993–1995)
Dr Peter Larkins (1996–2010)
 Brian Taylor (1995–2010)
 James Brayshaw (2009–2011)
 Danny Frawley (2005–2008)
 Dermott Brereton (1993–2011)
 Simon Madden (1993–1998)
 David Rhys-Jones (1993–1998)
 Nathan Thompson (2009–2011)
 Garry Lyon (1999–2005)
 Sam Newman (1993–1998)
 Billy Brownless (1998–2021)
 Craig Hutchinson (2013–2016)
 Mark Bickley (2003–2007)
 Luke Ball (2014–2016)

Swimming

 Tony Jones (2022 FINA World Swimming Championships (25 m) Host)
 Ian Thorpe (2022 FINA World Swimming Championships (25 m) Expert Commentator)
 Giaan Rooney (2022 FINA World Swimming Championships (25 m) Expert Commentator)
 Ariarne Titmus (2022 FINA World Swimming Championships (25 m) Expert Commentator)
 Seb Costello (2022 FINA World Swimming Championships (25 m) Host/Reporter)
 James Bracey (2022 FINA Aquatics Championship Host)

See also
 ABC Sport
 Seven Sport
 10 Sport
 SBS Sport
 Fox Sports (Australia)
 Stan Sport
 List of Australian television series
 List of longest running Australian television series
 Sports broadcasting contracts in Australia

References

External links
 
 Wide World of Sports entry at IMDb

1956 establishments in Australia
Sports divisions of TV channels
Australian sport websites